Adherents of Jainism first arrived in the United Kingdom in the 19th century. Britain, mainly England, has since become a center of the Jain diaspora with a population of 40,000 in 2007.

History
In 1873 Hermann Jacobi encountered Jain texts in London. He later visited India to further study and translate some of them. Later during 1891–1901, Mahatma Gandhi in London corresponded with Shrimad Rajchandra regarding questions raised by missionaries.

Champat Rai Jain was in England during 1892–1897, to study law. He established the Rishabh Jain Lending library 1930. Later he translated several Jain texts into English.

During 1906–1910, Jugmandar Lal Jaini was at Oxford as a law student. In 1909 he created the Jain Literature Society in London together with F. W. Thomas and H. Warren.

In 1949 The World Jaina Mission was founded in London, by M. McKay, W. H. Talbot, F. Mansell, and Mrs. K. P. Jain.

Exodus of Asians from East Africa  
After the independence of the various East African colonies in early 1960s, Jains of Gujarati origin who had been in the colonies for decades started moving to UK. This process accelerated after the 1972 Idi Amin expulsion of  Asians  from Uganda. Most of the Gujarati Jains from East Africa belonged either to the Visa Oshwal community, originally from the Halar region of Saurashtra or the Jamnagar Srimali community .

Jain Samaj Leicester
In 1973 the Jain Samaj Leicester was formed. In 1979 an old church building on Oxford Street, in the heart of Leicester, was bought and named the Jain Centre. In 1980, the Jain Samaj was expanded as a European body.

In 1982, the Jain Samaj opened an office in London. The All India (Overseas) Jinalaya Samiti was created  to complete the temple according to the plans drawn by the architects from Leicester, Bombay and Ahmedabad.

In 1983, on 10 November, Shilanyas ceremony (the laying of the foundation stones) for the first fully consecrated Jain temple in the western world, was performed. In 1984, on 14 December, the Anjanshalaka ceremony was carried at Pali for the images of Shantinath, Mahavir and Parswanath. In 1985, on 25 August, the above images were placed in the Jain Centre, Leicester. In 1988, on 8 July, the images were entered in the Garbagriha (permanent place of adobe) and the Pratistha ceremony was celebrated for 16 days from 8 July 1988 to 23 July 1988.

British Jain temples and institutes
Leicester Jain Centre
 Jain Samaj Leicester and Temple 
 Jain Samaj Wellingborough and temple 
 Jain Samaj Thornton Heath (Croydon)
 Jain Samaj Potters Bar - Jain temple and community centre
 Kailash Giri Jain temple, London
 Mahavir Foundation temple (Kenton derasar), 557 Kenton Road, Kenton, Middlesex
 Shri Mahavir Swami Jain Temple, Harrow, London
 Oshwal Centre, Hertfordshire.  First on virgin ground in Europe.
 Institute of Jainology (IOJ) at Greenford, London.
In 2020, Historic England (HE) published A Survey of Jain Buildings in England with the aim of providing information about buildings that Jains use in England so that HE can work with communities to enhance and protect those buildings now and in the future. The scoping survey identified 27 Jain Buildings.

Gallery

See also

Jainism in India
Jainism in Europe
Jainism in the United States
Jainism in Australia
Jainism in Japan
Jainism in Africa
Jainism in Singapore

References

Further reading
 The Western Order of Jainism by Nathubhai Shah of London (Jain Journal Vol XXX1, No 1 July 1996)
 Jainism A Way of Life by Vinod Kapashi
 Jains and Their Religion in America: A Social Survey by Dr. Bhuvannendra Kumar (Jain Journal Vol XXX1, No 1 July 1996)
 JAIN eLibrary attempts to provide an increasingly complete digitized collection of Jain Scriptures, dictionaries, encyclopedias, articles, commentaries, photographs, and other materials related to Jain life.

 
Jain communities
Indian diaspora in the United Kingdom